Dalbergia neoperrieri is a species of legume in the family Fabaceae.
It is found only in Madagascar.
It is threatened by habitat loss.

References

Sources

neoperrieri
Endemic flora of Madagascar
Vulnerable plants
Taxonomy articles created by Polbot